Resident Evil: The Final Chapter is a 2016 action horror film written and directed by Paul W. S. Anderson. The direct sequel to Resident Evil: Retribution (2012), it is the sixth installment in the Resident Evil film series and the final installment in the original series, which is based on the video game series of the same name. The film stars Milla Jovovich, Iain Glen, Ali Larter, Shawn Roberts, Eoin Macken, Fraser James, Ruby Rose, Rola, and William Levy. In the film, Alice and her friends are betrayed by Albert Wesker, who gathers the entire forces of the Umbrella Corporation into one final strike against the apocalypse survivors.

A sixth film in the series was announced to be in development by Sony Pictures in 2012, and Anderson later expressed his desire for it to "come full circle", bringing back characters, themes and the environment of the Hive from the first film. It was filmed in 2D and post-converted to stereoscopic 3D, and principal photography commenced on September 18, 2015 in South Africa.

Resident Evil: The Final Chapter was released on December 23, 2016, in Japan and on January 27, 2017, in the United States in 2D, 3D and IMAX 3D. The film received mixed reviews and became the highest-grossing film in the franchise, earning over $312 million worldwide against a $40 million budget. A reboot, Resident Evil: Welcome to Raccoon City, was released November 24, 2021.

Plot 

In a flashback, it is revealed that Dr. James Marcus, the founder of the Umbrella Corporation, had a daughter, Alicia, who was dying of progeria. Desperate to save her, Marcus confiscates an untested embryonic Umbrella project created by his colleague Dr. Charles Ashford—the T-virus—and uses it on Alicia and others with the disease. After one child treated with the virus dies and becomes a zombie, Marcus immediately orders the project be terminated, all data on it be destroyed and forbids Ashford from ever pursuing it again, devastating Ashford who needed the T-Virus to save his own daughter Angela. Marcus's partner, Dr. Alexander Isaacs, has Marcus murdered by Albert Wesker, adopts Alicia and takes over the Corporation. Alicia inherits her father's 50% ownership.

After being betrayed by Wesker in Washington D.C., Alice awakens. The Red Queen appears and tells her she has 48 hours to infiltrate the Hive, a facility beneath Raccoon City. The Umbrella Corporation has an airborne anti-virus that can kill every zombie, but is waiting for the last few remaining humans to be wiped out. As her body carries the virus, Alice does not expect to live after the mission.

While travelling, Alice is captured by Isaacs, learning the "Isaacs" she previously killed was a clone. She escapes his convoy and reaches Raccoon City, where she meets a group of survivors: Doc, Abigail, Christian, Cobalt, Razor, and Claire Redfield, who survived the attack on Arcadia. Isaacs' convoy approaches, trailed by a horde of zombies. Alice and the group defeat them and retrieves Isaacs' few human captives, though Cobalt dies in the process. Alice and crew enter the Hive, where Wesker is in control. He releases mutated guard dogs, killing Christian and a freed captive.

The Red Queen appears to Alice and explains that her program is in conflict, as she can never hurt an Umbrella employee but also must value human life. She plays a video of Isaacs explaining to Umbrella's executives a plan to release the T-virus, cleansing the world of humanity; many of the rich and powerful, including the company executives, are stored in cryogenic capsules in the Hive, with the intention of rebuilding the world following the resulting apocalypse. The Red Queen warns Alice that someone in her group is helping Umbrella.

The group encounters several traps that end up killing Abigail and Razor. Alice and Doc plant bombs throughout the Hive taken from the leftover equipment of James Shade's team, and confront the real, tech-upgraded, Isaacs. Doc turns out to be Umbrella's spy, and Claire is captured by Wesker. A cryogenic capsule opens, releasing Alicia Marcus, Umbrella's co-owner, and Marcus' daughter. Isaacs reveals to Alice that she is actually a clone of Alicia. He plans to eliminate the pair and assume control of Umbrella. Alicia fires Wesker, allowing the Red Queen to crush his legs with a security door. Doc tries to shoot Alice, but his gun is empty—as Alice had earlier deduced his treachery—and Claire kills him. After giving Wesker a deadman's switch to the primed bombs, Alice and Claire pursue Isaacs while Alicia uploads a copy of her childhood memories.

Isaacs, Alice and Claire fight. Isaacs overpowers them at first, but Alice manages to activate a grenade in his pocket and kill him. She escapes to the surface with the anti-virus, but Isaacs reboots and catches her before she can release it. Before he can kill her, the Isaacs clone from the convoy arrives and kills him, believing himself to be the original Isaacs. The clone is then devoured by the undead. Alice releases the anti-virus, killing all of the zombies around her before she passes out. Wesker simultaneously drops the deadman's switch, destroying himself, Alicia, the Hive, and the hibernating Umbrella elite.

Claire wakes Alice, who survived because the anti-virus killed the T-virus within her body, not the healthy cells. The Red Queen uploads Alicia's childhood memories into Alice, granting her a childhood. Alice travels into Manhattan, saying that the anti-virus, carried only by the winds, will take years to reach all corners of the globe, and until it does, her mission is not finished.

Cast 

 Milla Jovovich as Alice and her clones, former Umbrella security officer-turned-resistance fighter, who had been captured by Umbrella scientists after the original Hive contamination and experimented on. Several years after Raccoon City is destroyed and the virus has spread across the globe, she has bonded with the virus on a cellular level, giving her superhuman ability since her previous encounter with Albert Wesker. She continues her vengeance against Umbrella for the death of her allies and those responsible for unleashing the deadly apocalypse. She is revealed to be the last of many Alice clones created by Umbrella.
 Jovovich also plays the role of the older Alicia Marcus, daughter of the creator of the T-virus, co-owner (from her father's share) of the Umbrella Corporation and the source from whom the Alices were cloned.
 Iain Glen as Dr. Alexander Isaacs (and one clone), the technologically enhanced CEO of the Umbrella Corporation previously thought to have been killed by Alice, who was revealed to be a clone. He maniacally intended to use the T-virus to start a biblical apocalypse, wiping out most of humanity and leaving a few tens of thousands alive, so as to remake the world with Umbrella's designs.
 Ali Larter as Claire Redfield, one of Alice's closest allies, formerly led the convoy of survivors in the Nevada desert, and had gone missing along with her brother, Chris Redfield, after Umbrella's assault on Arcadia. She joins Alice and the others on the mission to the Hive to defeat Isaacs.
 Shawn Roberts as Albert Wesker and his clone, the former chairman of Umbrella who is the personal subordinate of Dr. Isaacs, and is also the mastermind of the plot which has betrayed Alice once again after the events of the previous film. After the Red Queen slammed a door that amputated his legs, Alice gives him the deadman's trigger to bombs she has planted inside the Hive—allowing her and Claire to escape as he slowly passes out from blood loss.
 Eoin Macken as Doc, a spy working for Umbrella, posing as one of the survivors as assigned by Isaacs to find Alice.
 Fraser James as Razor, a survivor who aids Alice and the others into the Hive.
 Ruby Rose as Abigail, an inmate survivor who also joins Alice's attack into the Hive.
 William Levy as Christian, the leading survivor who led the assault on Umbrella and is also at odds with Alice.
 Rola as Cobalt, a survivor who joins the assault on Umbrella.
 Ever Anderson as Red Queen, the artificial intelligence created by Umbrella, and also one of Alice's former enemies, now turned rogue. Unable to act directly against Umbrella employees, but recognizing her role in the fate of humanity, Red Queen gives information to Alice in order to help release the antivirus and defeat Isaacs.
 Anderson also plays the young Alicia Marcus.
 Lee Joon-gi as Commander Chu, Umbrella's security chief and second-in-command.
 Mark Simpson as Dr. James Marcus

Ever Anderson, who plays Young Alicia/Red Queen, is the daughter of Jovovich and Paul W. S. Anderson, the film's writer/director. Additionally, Joseph May appeared as Dr. Blue via archival footage.

Production

Development
In September 2012, following the box office success of Resident Evil: Retribution, a sixth film in the Resident Evil film series was confirmed by the head of Sony Pictures distribution, Rory Bruer, with Milla Jovovich attached to reprise the role of Alice. In October 2012, in an interview with Forbes, producer Samuel Hadida stated that a sixth and seventh installment were being planned and a reboot of the series was possible. In December 2012, director Paul W. S. Anderson confirmed that he would be directing "Resident Evil 6". He stated that it would be the last film in the series and some characters from the first two films would return. In June 2013, Jovovich tweeted that the sixth film, which had been scheduled for a September 12, 2014, release, would not be released before 2015. The film was scheduled to start shooting in late 2013 as soon as Anderson had finished work on his disaster/romance film Pompeii.

In February 2014, Anderson told Collider that "we'd like to do another Resident Evil movie. Definitely. But the wheels aren't quite in motion yet,"; the film was reportedly planned to be released in 2015. In April 2014, while speaking at the Beijing International Film Festival, Anderson revealed that he would soon be writing the screenplay for the sixth film in the series. He also confirmed that the film would be in 3D and that actress Li Bingbing would be returning to play Ada Wong. In June 2014, Anderson announced the film's working title to be "Resident Evil: The Final Chapter" and confirmed that it was intended to be the final film in the series. He also revealed that half the script had been completed, but, as yet, there were no shooting or release schedules. Filming was set to begin in South Africa in August 2014 but was delayed for a year because of Jovovich's pregnancy.

On July 15, 2015, Jovovich posted a photo on Instagram announcing that shooting was about to start in South Africa. Several actors from previous films, including Sienna Guillory (Jill Valentine), Li Bingbing (Ada Wong), Aryana Engineer (Becky), Spencer Locke (K-Mart), Michelle Rodriguez (Rain Ocampo), Wentworth Miller (Chris Redfield), and Johann Urb (Leon S. Kennedy) were not cast to return for the last movie. On August 3, 2015, it was confirmed that Ali Larter would be back for the sequel in the role of Claire Redfield, and filming would begin in late August or early September. Larter confirmed the sixth film would be the last in the franchise. On September 18, 2015, other cast members were announced including Iain Glen as Dr. Alexander Isaacs, Shawn Roberts as Albert Wesker, Ruby Rose as Abigail, Eoin Macken as Doc, William Levy as Christian, Fraser James as Michael, and Rola as Cobalt. On October 19, 2015, Lee Joon-gi joined the film to play Commander Lee of the Umbrella Corporation.

Filming 
Principal photography on the film began on September 18, 2015, in Cape Town / Hartbeespoort Dam, South Africa. Further filming took place in Queensland, Australia at Village Roadshow studios in the Gold Coast as well as Brisbane and Magnetic Island.

Filming ended on December 9, 2015. According to Paul W. S. Anderson, the director, Resident Evil: The Final Chapter was fully shot with 2D cameras and post-converted to 3D by the company: Legend 3D. It's the first time that a movie from the Resident Evil saga has a 3D post-conversion, since the last two installments were shot in 3D.

Stuntwoman injury and crew fatality
During filming, Jovovich's stunt double, South African stunt-woman Olivia Jackson, was severely injured on 5 September 2015 when her motorcycle collided with a camera crane. She had been riding at high speed without a helmet, and the camera crane had failed to move out of the way in time. According to the production company the crane had malfunctioned.

Jackson was in a medically induced coma for two weeks. Among her injuries were cerebral trauma, a crushed face, a severed artery in her neck, a paralyzed arm, several broken ribs, a shattered scapula, a broken clavicle, torn fingers with a thumb that needed to be amputated, and five nerves torn out of her spinal cord. She announced in December 2015 that her paralyzed left arm would need to be amputated.

In 2019 Jackson sued the producers for "elevating financial considerations over safety." She and the crane operator both claimed in her lawsuit that director Anderson had changed his mind about the angle of the filming, and gave the crane operator the order to raise the camera one second later than he had done in the two rehearsals immediately before. She also said that she was misled to believe there was insurance covering injuries, when there was only minor insurance not even covering medical care, so had she had known she would not have accepted the job. Jackson won the lawsuit.

A second accident occurred during filming on December 3 when crew member Ricardo Cornelius was crushed to death by one of the film's props, a US Army-issue Hummer, while on set.

Release

Theatrical
Sony first scheduled the film for release on September 12, 2014, before delaying it over two years. It was released in Japan on December 23, 2016, and in North America on January 27, 2017, by Screen Gems.

Japanese rock band L'Arc-en-Ciel created the song "Don't Be Afraid" specifically for the Japanese theatrical release.

Home media

Reception

Box office
Resident Evil: The Final Chapter grossed $26.8 million in the United States and Canada and $285.4 million in other territories for a worldwide total of $312.2 million, against a production budget of $40 million. In North America, it was released alongside A Dog's Purpose and Gold, and was projected to gross around $13 million from 3,050 theaters in its opening weekend. It made $1 million from Thursday night previews and $5.1 million on its first day. It ended up opening to $13.9 million, the lowest debut of the franchise, and finished 4th at the box office.

In China, the film was trimmed by 7 minutes by the violence-intolerant State Administration of Press, Publication, Radio, Film and Television, and opened on February 24, 2017 across 11,000 screens, earning $30 million on its first day. Through its opening weekend, the film made 636.9 million yuan ($92.7 million). This marked the biggest Friday-through-Sunday debut ever for an imported film, topping Transformers: Age of Extinction (632 million yuan) and Captain America: Civil War (628 million yuan), and the second-biggest for all films, behind Lost in Thailand. However, figures varied slightly by different outlets—Shanghai-based cinema consulting firm Artisan Gateway had its opening weekend at $93.9 million while the film's studio, Sony Pictures came in higher with $94.3 million. Mainland China was the movie's highest-grossing foreign market, contributing $160 million from the box office.

Critical response
Resident Evil: The Final Chapter received mixed reviews from critics. The website's critical consensus reads, "Resident Evil: The Final Chapter may prove mind-numbingly chaotic for the unconverted, but for fans of the venerable franchise, it offers a fittingly kinetic conclusion to its violent post-apocalyptic saga." On Metacritic the film has a weighted average score 49 out of 100, based on 19 critics, indicating "mixed or average reviews". Audiences polled by CinemaScore gave the film an average grade of "B" on an A+ to F scale.

Alex Welch of IGN was critical of the film, giving 3/10 and calling it "a pointless mess from beginning to end", and "nothing more than a barrage of clichéd character beats, unbearable CGI action, and headache-inducing editing". Glenn Kenny for The New York Times wrote, "This is, I think, the weakest picture in the franchise".

The decision not to bring back surviving characters from the previous films—notably Jill, Leon and Ada—was a particular draw for criticism, with many voicing disappointment over a lack of closure for said characters and a sense of anti-climax following the cliff-hanger ending of the previous movie that had implied their inclusion in a follow-up.

Bill Zwecker of Chicago Sun-Times gave the film 3 stars out of 4, saying it "[gets] the storyline right off the bat". He added, "For fans of Resident Evil, I believe this final film will not disappoint, but it also will likely encourage newcomers to the saga to go back and play a bit of catch-up by watching the earlier movies".

Peter Bradshaw of The Guardian thought "Jovovich and Glen do their best with what they’re given, and the digital rendering of that wrecked vista of Washington DC is impressive, but in dramatic terms it’s as perfunctorily presented as everything else. Another deafening, boring episode."

Accolades

Reboot

In May 2017, Martin Moszkowicz announced a reboot in development, to be produced by James Wan with a script by Greg Russo. In December 2018, Wan and Russo left the project, and Johannes Roberts was hired as writer and director. In October 2020, Deadline reported that several characters had been cast for the movie, and that it would be an origin story set in 1998. The film was released on November 24, 2021.

See also
 List of films based on video games

References

External links
 
 
 
 

2016 films
2010s English-language films
2016 3D films
2016 action thriller films
2016 horror films
2010s science fiction horror films
American action thriller films
American post-apocalyptic films
American science fiction action films
American science fiction horror films
American sequel films
American zombie films
Australian action thriller films
Australian zombie films
Australian science fiction action films
Australian sequel films
British action thriller films
British post-apocalyptic films
British science fiction action films
British science fiction horror films
British sequel films
Canadian action thriller films
Canadian post-apocalyptic films
Canadian science fiction action films
Canadian science fiction horror films
Canadian sequel films
Constantin Film films
English-language Canadian films
English-language French films
English-language German films
Films about cloning
Films about immunity
Films about viral outbreaks
Films about psychic powers
Films about rebellions
Films directed by Paul W. S. Anderson
Films produced by Paul W. S. Anderson
Films scored by Paul Haslinger
Films shot in South Africa
Films with screenplays by Paul W. S. Anderson
French action thriller films
French post-apocalyptic films
French science fiction action films
French science fiction horror films
French sequel films
German action thriller films
German post-apocalyptic films
German science fiction action films
German science fiction horror films
German sequel films
Girls with guns films
IMAX films
Final Chapter, The
Screen Gems films
Films set in the United States
2010s American films
2010s Canadian films
2010s British films
2010s French films
2010s German films